Austropyrgus bunyaensis is a species of minute freshwater snail with an operculum, an aquatic gastropod mollusc or micromollusc in the Hydrobiidae family. This species is endemic to southeastern Queensland, Australia. It is only known from small streams near the top of Mount Mowbullan, Bunya Mountains.

See also 
 List of non-marine molluscs of Australia

References

Further reading

External links

Hydrobiidae
Austropyrgus
Gastropods of Australia
Endemic fauna of Australia
Gastropods described in 1999